Ganeshganj is a town in Damoh district of Madhya Pradesh, India.

Damoh
Cities and towns in Damoh district